The 2021 Purdue Boilermakers football team represented Purdue University during the 2021 NCAA Division I FBS football season. The Boilermakers played their home games at Ross–Ade Stadium in West Lafayette, Indiana, and competed as members of the West Division in the Big Ten Conference. This was head coach Jeff Brohm's fifth season with Purdue.

Previous season
In a season limited by the ongoing COVID-19 pandemic, the Boilermakers played a conference-only schedule and finished the 2020 season 2–4 to finish in sixth place in the West Division. Games against Wisconsin and Indiana were canceled due to concerns about COVID-19 outbreaks, which marked the first time Purdue did not play Indiana since the Old Oaken Bucket trophy was created.

Offseason

Coaching changes
On December 17, 2020, Purdue announced that defensive coordinator Bob Diaco would not return to the coaching staff. On January 10, 2021, the school hired Mark Hagen as defensive line coach, replacing Terrance Jamison. Hagen had coached at Purdue from 2000−10 and was most recently at Texas. Later that month, Brad Lambert from Marshall was hired as defensive coordinator and linebackers coach, while Ron English from Florida was hired as cornerback coach. In April, Jamal Adams from Navy was hired as cornerback coach. On June 16, Jeff Brohm announced that Lambert, English, and Hagen would all serve as co-defensive coordinators in addition to their regular coaching duties, with Lambert making the game-day play calls. Former graduate assistants Justin Sinz and TJ McCollum would move to recruiting positions. In August, David Elson from Marian University was hired as quality control assistant and Mel Mills was hired as director of player development.

Transfers
Outgoing

Notable departures from the 2020 squad included:

Incoming

2021 NFL Draft

Boilermakers who were picked in the 2021 NFL Draft:

Preseason

Recruits
The Boilermakers signed a total of 16 recruits.

Schedule 
The 2021 schedule consists of 6 home and 6 away games in the regular season.

Roster

Awards and honors

Award watch lists
Listed in the order that they were released

Weekly Awards

All-Conference Honors

All-American Honors

Rankings

Season summary

Oregon State

500th game at Ross-Ade Stadium

References

Purdue
Purdue Boilermakers football seasons
Music City Bowl champion seasons
Purdue Boilermakers football